Andrey Sergeyevich Ishchenko (born 9 March 1981), is a Russian politician who currently serves as a member of parliament in the Legislative Assembly of Primorsky Krai.

Biography

Andrey Ishchenko was born on 9 March 1981 in the city of Lesozavodsk, Primorsky Krai. From 1988 to 1997, he studied at the secondary school No. 74 of the city of Vladivostok. In 1998, he entered that university. During the years of training, he was the commander of a platoon of cadets. He practiced on the sail training ship Pallada under the guidance of the sea captain .

In 2004, he received a diploma of higher education with a degree in navigation engineer. He was awarded the military rank of lieutenant, military registration specialty, a commander of a mine-torpedo warhead, combat use of anti-submarine and torpedo weapons of surface ships.

In 2005, he began his maritime career in the Far Eastern Shipping Company as a third mate. In five years of work, he rose to the position of chief mate.

In 2011, he began work in the construction industry of the Primorsky Krai as an assistant to the director of a construction enterprise Investment company Vostochnye Vorota under the leadership of the Honored Builder of the RSFSR, Honorary Builder of Russia - Ivan Bulenko.

In 2014, he headed the construction company Aurora-Story LLC, which is engaged in housing construction in the cities of Primorsky Krai.

On 18 September 2016, Ishchenko  a member of parliament, a deputy to the Legislative Assembly of Primorsky Krai of the sixth convocation in a single-mandate constituency number 1 - Vladivostok, part of the Pervomaisky district, gaining 24.66% of the votes of voters who came to the polling stations.

He is a former member of the Vladivostok Committee of the Communist Party of the Russian Federation, secretary of the primary branch of Pervomaiskoye.

In an interview, Ishchenko said that as the head of the region he was going to implement his program "20 steps" and was reforming the administration of the region. He promised to "continue the president's policy."

At the 2018 Russian elections, on 9 September 2018, Ishchenko took second place in the first round of the September 2018 Primorsky Krai gubernatorial election, gaining 24.63% of the vote. His opponent, Andrey Tarasenko, won 46.56% of the vote.

He reached the second round of voting, which took place on 16 September.

The head of the Central Election Commission, Ella Pamfilova, said that the CEC will not sum up the results of the governor elections in Primorye until it understands the situation. Later, the election results were annulled, and Ishchenko went to court. On 28 December 2018, the Supreme Court of Russia dismissed the claim. The Communist Party of the Russian Federation did not nominate Ishchenko to run in the re-run, claiming that he won the governor's election, but that victory was stolen.

On 7 November 2018, Ishchenko announced on his social networks his decision to participate in the repeated December 2018 Primorsky Krai gubernatorial election on 16 December as a self-nominated candidate. Ishchenko's headquarters collected more than 15,000 signatures of the inhabitants of the region (submitted to the Regional Election Commission - 8,000 signatures) and the required number of signatures of municipal deputies of various levels (municipal filter). Registration as a candidate for governor was denied.

In the fall of 2021, Ishchenko was arrested on suspicion of fraud in the construction of a residential building on the funds of equity holders. The amount of damage by the prosecutor's office is estimated at 380 million rubles.

In October 2022, Ishchenko applied to the military commissariat with a request to send him to fight in Ukraine.

Family
Ishchenko has a son and daughter.

References

1981 births
Living people
Communist Party of the Russian Federation members
People from Lesozavodsk